Jules Desrochers (30 June 1874 – 4 January 1939) was a Liberal party member of the House of Commons of Canada. He was born in Lotbinière, Quebec and became a pharmacist and physician.

Desrochers attended school at the Quebec Seminary, then earned his MD degree at Université Laval in 1899. From 1914 to 1921, he served as mayor of Saint-Raymond, Quebec and also served as president of the local school commission from 1908 to 1928.

He was first elected to Parliament at the Portneuf riding in the 1930 general election. He served only one term, the 17th Canadian Parliament, then left federal politics as he did not seek re-election in the 1935 vote.

References

External links
 

1874 births
1939 deaths
Canadian pharmacists
Liberal Party of Canada MPs
Mayors of places in Quebec
Members of the House of Commons of Canada from Quebec
Université Laval alumni
Physicians from Quebec